Omar Khalidi (1952 – 29 November 2010), born in Hyderabad, India, was a Muslim scholar, a staff member of MIT in the US, and an author.

Early life and education

Khalidi was born in 1953 in Hyderabad, India. He was of Hadhrami descent.

Career

He is referred to by one commentator as the "Chronicler of Hyderabad and as a champion of minority rights". He was considered an international relations builder.

Scholar

His best known book is Hyderabad after the fall (book)|Hyderabad: After the Fall published in 1990.

Media contribution

Khalidi served as a regional Vice-President of American Federation of Muslims of Indian Origin, and was an active participant in the various activities of all other Indian Muslim organisations in the USA and Canada. His articles were published regularly in the MetroWest Daily News and he was an active columnist for various other journals, writing for the Economic and Political Weekly, The Outlook, India Abroad, Two Circles and other print and internet media.

Books

His books include:

Death
Khalidi died on 29 November 2010, in a train accident at Kendall Square, MBTA station in Cambridge, Massachusetts. His family published a statement in the Arab News on 30 November 2010: Khalidi drove in his car to the MIT campus and was probably trying to catch a train to buy medicine at the next station. He was diabetic, and it seems his sugar level had reached abnormal levels and he was hit by a train in Boston, United States His funeral prayers were held at the Islamic Society of Boston Cultural Center in Roxbury.

He left his wife Nigar Khalidi and his daughter Aliya.

See also
 Hyderabadi Muslims
 Golkonda
 Hyderabad State
 India
 Muslim culture of Hyderabad
 History of Hyderabad for a history of the city of Hyderabad.
 Hyderabad (India) for the city.
 Muhammad Hamidullah

References

External links
MIT News
Rediff News, Remembering Omar Khalidi, Interview

Dr Omar Khalidi's voice will be sorely missed, Rediff.com
The Rediff Interview of Dr. Omar Khalidi about his book Khaki and Ethnic Violence in India,..
Dr. Omar Khalidi article: Mawlāna Mawdūd? and the Future Political Order in British India
Dr. Omar Khalidi article: The Caliph's Daughter

Indian Sunni Muslims
2010 deaths
Indian Sunni Muslim scholars of Islam
Writers from Hyderabad, India
Journalists from Andhra Pradesh
American male journalists
American writers of Indian descent
American columnists
American essayists
American foreign policy writers
American male non-fiction writers
American magazine editors
American Muslims
Harvard Extension School alumni
Indian emigrants to the United States
Indian international relations scholars
American international relations scholars
Indian magazine editors
Massachusetts Institute of Technology faculty
Alumni of the University of Wales, Lampeter
Academic staff of King Saud University
1953 births
American male essayists
Wichita State University alumni
Hadhrami people
Indian people of Yemeni descent
Naqshbandi order